Nymphicula lifuensis is a moth in the family Crambidae. It was described by David John Lawrence Agassiz in 2014. It is found on the Loyalty Islands east of Australia.

The wingspan is about 14 mm. The base of the forewings is brown, but paler dorsally. The antemedian fascia is whitish and there is a dark fuscous streak beneath the costa. The median area is scaled with dark fuscous and the terminal area is ochreous. The base of the hindwings is white, mixed with fuscous and the subbasal fascia is white. There is a fuscous antemedian line.

Etymology
The species name refers to the island of Lifou, where the species was collected.

References

Nymphicula
Moths described in 2014